Universitetet (Swedish: "the university") is the name of two rail stations, both named for Stockholm University.

 Universitetet railway station
 Universitetet metro station